Cycas media is a palm-like cone-bearing plant widespread in seasonally dry tropical sclerophyll woodlands close to the east coast of Queensland, with scattered occurrences also in northern Northern Territory and Western Australia, Australia. The dark green leathery, thick leaves are pinnately divided and grow in annual flushes from a massive apical bud. It is tolerant of bushfire and often re-foliates immediately following a dry season fire, before the beginning of the next rainy season. All plant parts are considered highly toxic. However, the seeds were eaten by Aboriginal Australians  after careful and extensive preparation to remove the toxins.

The 1889 book 'The Useful Native Plants of Australia records that common names included "Nut Palm" while Central Queensland Indigenous people referred to the plant as "Baveu" and that "An excellent farina is
obtained from it. The nuts are deprived of their outer succulent cover (sarcocarp) and are then broken; and the kernels, having been roughly pounded, are dried three or four hours in the sun, then brought in a dilly-bag to a stream or pond, where they remain in the running water four or five days, and in stagnant water three or four days. By a touch of the fingers the proper degree of softness produced by maceration is ascertained. They are afterwards placed between the two stones mentioned under Colocasia macrorrhizon, reduced to a fine paste, and then baked under the ashes in the same way that our bush people bake their damper. (Thozet.)"

References

media
Cycadophyta of Australia
Endemic flora of Australia
Flora of Queensland
Bushfood
Plants described in 1810
Taxa named by Robert Brown (botanist, born 1773)